Richard Jones (born 23 May 1974) is a Welsh bassist, pianist and backing vocalist from Cwmaman, Wales, for the Welsh post-Britpop rock band Stereophonics, playing alongside Kelly Jones (no relation), Adam Zindani and Jamie Morrison.

Jones grew up in Cwmaman, an old mining village in South Wales. Richard originally formed the band with Kelly Jones and Stuart Cable, playing under the name "Tragic Love Company". Jones played to his largest audience on 2 July 2005 as the group appeared at the Live 8 concert, in Hyde Park, London.

Jones is often noted for his tattoos, and claims; "I got my first tattoo done in one of the Welsh Valleys when I was 16 or 17. By law you shouldn't have them before you're 18 but this tattooist bloke figured if you were old enough to walk in his shop, you were old enough to have them done. I wanted Jonesy tattooed on my arm but he spelt it wrong and put J-O-N-S-E-Y. I went back a few weeks later and asked for a big tattoo on my body but I hadn't got enough money, so instead he tattooed Richard on the side of my neck. I quite regret that one, actually." The 'Jonsey' tattoo on Jones' upper-right arm, among others, has since been covered up by Maori, Japanese and Tibetan designs across his arms and upper chest. He is an avid motorcycle enthusiast and has had multiple Ducati bikes.

See also
List of bass guitarists
Stereophonics discography

References

1974 births
Living people
Welsh bass guitarists
People from Aberdare
21st-century bass guitarists